The Anti-Narcotics Force (reporting name: ANF) is a federal executive bureau of the Government of Pakistan, tasked with combating the narcotics smuggling and use within Pakistan. ANF works under the umbrella of Pakistan Army and Ministry of Narcotics Control (Pakistan) of which Shahzain Bugti is the minister since March 2022. Due to misconception on Section 4 of ANF ACT 1997, the force's head consisted of the active-duty general officer of Pakistan Army. Although the law prescribes that any competent person may be appointed as Director-General. Currently, a two-star Army Officer, Major general Muhammad Aniq Ur Rehman Malik is deputed as Director-General. The ANF also has sole responsibility for coordinating and pursuing Pakistan narcotics investigations abroad.

The superintendence of the Force is a vest with the Federal Government whereas, administration of the Force is vested with the Director-General who shall exercise in respect of the Force all powers of an Inspector-General of Police under the Police Act, 1861 (V of 1861), and all other powers under the Act. In case of any officers and members from the Armed Forces, the Director-General shall have all powers conferred by or under the Pakistan Army Act, 1952 (XXXIX of 1952), the Pakistan Air Force Act, 1953 (VI op 1953), and the Pakistan Navy Ordinance, 1961 (XXXVI of 1961), respectively as an officer empowered to convene a General Court Martial. The Force consists of approximately 3100 agents across the country.

The organization has sacrificed 16 of its best enforcers including Offices, JCO's, and Jawans.

ANF Setup 
Anti Narcotics Force Headquarters is situated at Rawalpindi controlling its outfits through 5x Regional Headquarters i.e. North at Rawalpindi, KP at Peshawar, Punjab at Lahore, Sindh at Karachi, and Balochistan at Quetta. Regional Headquarters are controlling their area of the domain through their various Police Stations. There are 9x Directorates at HQ ANF:
 Logistics Directorate
 Enforcement Directorate (A, B, and I Branches)
 Law Directorate
 Assets and Financial Investigation Directorate
 Planning & Development Directorate
 International Cooperation Directorate
 Information Technology Directorate
 Drug Demand Reduction Directorate
 General Staff
 Aviation Branch

Association of other Institutions regarding Anti Narcotics and Anti Smuggling 

To protect Pakistan's National Security, the Anti-Narcotics Force under the insight of the Ministry of Narcotics Control is works in co-ordination with other Law Enforcement Agencies of Pakistan. Such as:
 Pakistan Coast Guards
 Pakistan Customs
 Provincial Excise
 Frontier Corps (KPK and Balochistan)
 Frontier Constabulary
 Pakistan Rangers (Punjab and Sindh)
 Political Levies and Khasadar Force
 Provincial Police (KPK, Punjab, Sindh, GB, AJK, and Balochistan)
 Airports Security Force(At Airports,ASF helps ANF to counter the drugs smuggling  threats at large scale)

History 
Pakistan Narcotics Board (PNB) was set up in 1957, in the Revenue Division in order to meet Pakistan's obligations under the International Opium Convention of 1925. PNB comprised representatives from the Provincial Governments and some Federal Ministries/Divisions.

Pakistan Narcotics Control Board (PNCB) was established in 1973 with five Regional Directorates, in response to UN Convention on Narcotics Control, with the mandate to combat narcotics in the Country. PNCB functioned as an attached department of the Ministry of Interior until 1989 with the strength of 883 all ranks. Narcotics Control Division (NCD) was established in 1989 and the Board became its attached department.

Anti Narcotics Task Force (ANTF) comprising 388 all ranks from Pakistan Army was established in December 1991 as an attached department of NCD.

Anti Narcotics Force (ANF) was raised on 21 February 1995 by merging PNCB and ANTF.

Narcotics Control Division (NCD) was declared Ministry of Narcotics Control in 2001 but it was reverted to NCD under Ministry of Interior and Narcotics Control (MOI&NC) in 2013.

Ministry of Narcotics Control (MNC) Ministry of Narcotics Control was established in August 2017.

ANF Intelligence and Investigation 
There are distinct stages for Investigating a case.

Stages 
Assets of the convicts in narcotics cases are confiscated in favor of the Federal Government through the following stages usually:
  Tracing: Finding out the true sources, disposition, movement or ownership of assets and includes determining the movement or conversion of assets by any means.
 Freezing: Prohibiting by an order made by the Special Court or an officer authorized under CNS Act 1997 the transfer, conversion, disposal or movement of any assets and includes the holding, controlling, assuming custody or managing any assets in pursuance of such order and, in the case of assets which are perishable the disposal thereof
 Forfeiture: Forfeiting of asset /property in favor of Federal Government.
 Realization: On finalization of forfeiture of assets and execution petition, the assets are realized in favor of the Federal Government.

Laws 
Assets Investigation is conducted under relevant sections/provisions provided by the following laws:
 Control of Narcotics Substance Act, 1997
 Anti Narcotics Force Act, 1997
 Code of Criminal Procedure, 1898
 Anti Money Laundering Act, 2010
 Prevention of Smuggling Act, 1977

The Operations 
According to activities of smugglers and areas which facilitate their interest, the operations of the Anti-Narcotics force can be divided into the following two categories:
 Anti Narcotics, Arms and Ammunition
 Anti Explosive Chemicals
 Anti Money Laundering

Policy Review Board 
To monitor the policies of the Federal Government a Policy Review Board headed by the Minister for Narcotics Control comprising 14 members from relevant Federal and Provincial Ministries was set up in 1997. A separate ministry for Narcotics Control has been set up; therefore, there is a need to revise the composition of this body. The existing composition of the Policy Review Board is as follows

Narcotics Interdiction Committee 
To make the coordinating role of the Federal Government effective and to ensure that narcotics interdiction by various law enforcement agencies proceeds under well-synchronized efforts, a Narcotics Interdiction Committee (NIC) has been set up with the following composition:

ANF's Charter of Duty 

Anti Narcotics Force (ANF) is responsible to perform the following

Supply Reduction

Limiting the smuggling trafficking and distribution of Narcotics. Coordinating eradication of opium poppy. Ensuring no heroin lab becomes functional. Inquire/Investigate assets of drug barons. Pursuing Legal cases relentlessly.

Demand Reduction

Reducing the demand for illicit drugs through preventive education, treatment, and rehabilitation as well as harm reduction programs.

Coordination Liaison at National and International Level

Enhancing international co-operation in the fight against drugs and liaison with the United Nations Office on Drugs and Crime, International Narcotics Control Board, International Police, Narcotics Affairs Section (US Embassy), Drugs Enforcement Agency, Foreign Anti Narcotics Community, Drug Liaison Officers, etc.

National Seizure Data– 2016 (ANF and Other Law Enforcement Agencies

SPEAR Strategy 

ANF has organized a strategy which is recognized as SPEAR. The inscription details are as under:

Surveillance and Intelligence Acquisition

Proactive Prevention and Protection

Effective Enforcement

Alliances, Assistance and Cooperation

Rehabilitation and Awareness

International Initiatives 

To make joint efforts for the control of drug trafficking, the agency in collaboration with the Government of Pakistan has signed MoUs with 32 countries and Letters of Intent with 2 x countries. Moreover, 15 x new MoUs and revisions for 5 x existing MoUs are also under process. Additionally, specific treaties have been signed with 29 x countries for the extradition of convicts on certain offenses including drug trafficking. Details of these agreements are as under:

Memorandum of Understanding (MOUs) 
Afghanistan, Australia, Azerbaijan, Brazil, Brunei Darussalam, Egypt, Hellenic Republic (Greece), India, Indonesia, Iran, Italy, Kazakhstan, Kingdom of Cambodia, Kuwait, Kyrgyzstan, Lao People's Democratic, Maldives, Nigeria, Republic of Philippines, Romania, Russia, Singapore, Sri Lanka, Syria, Tajikistan, Thailand, Turkey, UAE, United Kingdom, US and Uzbekistan

Under Process MoUs 
Bahrain, Canada, Kenya, Libya, Malaysia, Malta, Mauritius, Nepal, Oman, Saudi Arabia, Seychelles, South Africa, Turkmenistan and Ukraine.

Letter of Intent (LoI) 
Australia and China

Extradition Treaties 
Argentina, Belgium, France, Greece, Switzerland, US, Iran, Monaco, Netherlands, Denmark, Austria, Yugoslavia, Iraq, Ecuador, Portugal, Luxembourg, Colombia, Liberia, Cuba, San Marino, Italy, Egypt, Australia, Uzbekistan, Algeria, China, UAE, Libya and Kuwait.

World Anti-Narcotics Day 
UNODC observes 26 June as the "INTERNATIONAL DAY AGAINST DRUG ABUSE AND ILLICIT TRAFFICKING", established by the UN General Assembly in 1987. This observance manifests to further escalate the UN's resolve in creating a drug-free society by reducing both demands as well as the supply of illicit drugs and increasing awareness among the general masses regarding drug abuse. Each Year UNODC selects themes for International Drug Day and launches campaigns to raise public appreciation regarding the global drug issue and its effects on complete humanity. Past Observance themes for the last 5 years were:
 2015: "Let's Develop — Our Lives — Our Communities — Our Identities — Without Drugs"
 2014: "A message of hope: Drug use disorders are preventable and treatable"
 2013: "Make health your 'new high' in life, not drugs"
 2012: "Global Action for Healthy Communities without Drugs"
 2011: "Say No!"
 2010 : "Think health – not drugs"

World Anti-Narcotics Day in Pakistan

The magnitude of the drug menace not only undermines global public health, socio-economic synopsis, and international stability, it has also become an issue of  National Security for Pakistan. Pakistan itself is a poppy free country, but its population became a victim of regional opiate production. We are facing the brunt of trafficking of opiates and cannabis from the West, precursors from the East, and Amphetamine Type Stimulants from elsewhere.

Each year International Drug Day is celebrated by Anti Narcotics Force. ANF celebrate Drug Day in a wholesome manner so as to generate a strong message for the international community and domestic masses for general awareness and society's participation by introducing a variety of drug demand awareness activities in addition to drug burning ceremonies.

Model Addiction and Treatment Centres 
ANF is also playing a lead role in mass awareness and community participation programs to educate the people against drug abuse as Drug Demand Reduction has always been an important segment of our Strategy. ANF besides many awareness ventures runs 5 Model Addiction and Treatment Centres (MATRCs) at Rawalpindi, Peshawar, Quetta, Sukkur and Karachi and since their raising over twelve thousand patients have been treated.

Under the policy guidelines provided by NCD and with the co-operation of our allied countries, civil society, and the media, ANF is doing the best it can and has had significant successes in all three regimes of operation i.e. Drug Supply Reduction, Drug Demand Reduction, and International Cooperation. Men and women of ANF are fully committed to protecting our compatriots from the peril at cost of risk to their own lives.

References

External links 
 
 United Nation's Convention on Psychotropic Substances, 1971

Drug policy organizations
Federal law enforcement agencies of Pakistan
Drug policy of Pakistan